The Critics' Choice Super Award for Best Action Series is an award presented to the best television series in the action genre by the Critics Choice Association.

Winners and Nominees

Series with multiple nominations 
 9-1-1 (Fox) – 3
 Cobra Kai (Netflix), Kung Fu (The CW) – 2

Broadcast Film Critics Association Awards